BM Nazrul Islam (1 Dec 1946 – 7 April 2022) was a Bangladesh Awami League politician. He served as Jatiya Sangsad member representing the Satkhira-1 constituency during 1999–2001.

Career 
Islam was elected to parliament from Satkhira-1 as a Bangladesh Awami League candidate in 1999 by-election. The election was called after the incumbent, Syed Kamal Bakht, died in office. He was a chairman of Kalaroa upazila.

References 

1940s births
2022 deaths
People from Satkhira District
Awami League politicians
7th Jatiya Sangsad members
Date of birth missing
Place of birth missing